Kirvesniemi is a Finnish surname. Notable people with the surname include:

 Harri Kirvesniemi (born 1958), Finnish cross-country skier
 Marja-Liisa Kirvesniemi (born 1955), Finnish cross-country skier

Finnish-language surnames